is a Japanese male volleyball player whose position is wing spiker. With his club Panasonic Panthers, he competed at the 2013 FIVB Volleyball Men's Club World Championship.

References

External links
 profile at FIVB.org
 周囲の気迫に呼応して、大きく体をしならせる。力みのないスパイクとディグ。高く跳べば、迫力のスイングがその場の空気を切る。幼いころから「オールラウンドプレーヤー」を志してきた渡辺が、今、あらためて技術のブラッシュアップに燃えている at panasonic.co.jp

1990 births
Living people
Japanese men's volleyball players
Place of birth missing (living people)
Universiade medalists in volleyball
Universiade bronze medalists for Japan
Medalists at the 2013 Summer Universiade